Bailing out may refer to:

Parachuting out of an aircraft in an emergency
In rebreather scuba diving, a "bail out" is a backup breathing system for when the main breathing system fails; see Rebreather#Bailout
In balance boarding, hastily jumping off the board; see Balance board#Playing the game: its tension

See also
Bail (disambiguation)
Bale (disambiguation)